Girgaon, or Girgaum, is an area in southern Mumbai in Maharashtra, India. It is near the coast. A section of Marine Drive is located here.

See also
Girgaum Chowpatti
Tanks of Bombay

References

External links

 Girgaon

Neighbourhoods in Mumbai